The 1994 Philips Open was a men's tennis tournament played on outdoor clay courts at the Nice Lawn Tennis Club in Nice, France, and was part of the ATP World Series of the 1994 ATP Tour. It was the 23rd edition of the tournament and took place from 11 April until 17 April 1994. Unseeded Alberto Berasategui won the singles title.

Finals

Singles

 Alberto Berasategui defeated  Jim Courier 6–4, 6–2
 It was Berasategui's first singles title of the year and the second his career.

Doubles

 Javier Sánchez /  Mark Woodforde defeated  Hendrik Jan Davids /  Piet Norval 7–5, 6–3

References

External links
 ITF tournament edition details

Nice Open
1994
Swatch Open, 1994
Philips Open
20th century in Nice